John Jacob Loud (November 2, 1844 – August 10, 1916) was an American inventor known for designing the first ballpoint pen.

Trained as a lawyer at Harvard College, Loud worked at the Union National Bank in Weymouth, Massachusetts as a cashier. He was also active in his community as a member of his church, a trustee of many local organizations, and a member of local historical societies. Loud invented and obtained a patent for what is considered to be the first ballpoint pen in 1888; however, his invention was not commercialized and the patent would eventually lapse. The modern ballpoint pen would be patented later in 1938 by László Bíró, 22 years after Loud's death.

Early life and career
Loud was born in Weymouth, Massachusetts in 1844, the son of  John White Loud and Sarah Humphrey Blanchard. He attended school in Weymouth, graduating from Weymouth High School, and later attended Harvard College, graduating from the latter in law in the class of 1866. Appointed to the Suffolk County Bar on February 2, 1872, he later furthered his studies in law in the office of Jewell, Gaston & Field, but later opted to join his father in the banking profession. In 1871 he joined his father in working for the Union National Bank as an assistant cashier. Upon his father's death in 1874, Loud assumed his position as a cashier and remained in that post until his resignation in 1895 for health reasons.

Inventions

Keenly interested in inventing, on October 30, 1888, Loud obtained the first patent (US #392,046) for a ballpoint pen when attempting to make a writing instrument that would be able to write on leather products, which then-common fountain pens could not. Loud's pen had a small rotating steel ball, held in place by a socket. In the patent, he noted:

Although his invention could be used to mark rough surfaces such as leather, as he had originally intended, it proved to be too coarse for letter-writing. With no commercial viability, its potential went unexploited and the patent eventually lapsed.

Loud had also registered patents for a firecracker cannon (1888) and a "toy cannon" (1887).

Personal life, death
Residing in Weymouth, Loud was a member of the Union Congregational Church. He was an active genealogist, and an active member of the Maine Genealogical Society, New Hampshire Genealogical Society, New England Historic Genealogical Society, and Weymouth Historical Society (of which he was a founding member). He was a descendant of Francis Loud, originally of Ipswich, Massachusetts, and Mayflower passengers William Brewster and John Alden. Loud also was a trustee of the Weymouth Savings Banks, Tufts Library and the Derby Academy, and a conductor of the Union Religious Society choir at Weymouth and in Braintree. A noted orator, he spoke at many local events, including delivering an address upon the building of the first warship at the Fore River Shipyard in 1900. He also wrote poetry and songs in his spare time. One of his sisters, Annie Frances Loud, was a locally noted composer of "sacred music".

He was married to Emily Keith Vickery from November 7, 1872, until her death in November 1911. The couple had eight children. He died at his home in Weymouth on August 10, 1916, and was buried at Village Cemetery in Weymouth.

Notes

Though contemporary sources state he may have been a leather tanner at the time, biographical accounts do not support this.

References

1844 births
1916 deaths
People from Weymouth, Massachusetts
Harvard College alumni
19th-century American inventors